Nahr-e Khvaf (also Romanized as Nahr-e Khvāf) is a village in Jaffal Rural District, in the Central District of Shadegan County, Khuzestan Province, Iran. At the 2006 census, its population was 254, in 40 families.

References 

Populated places in Shadegan County